Frederick Corbin "Boots" Blesse (August 22, 1921 – October 31, 2012) was a United States Air Force major general and flying ace. He graduated from the United States Military Academy in 1945. He flew two combat tours during the Korean War, completing 67 missions in P-51s, 35 missions in F-80s and 121 missions in F-86s. During the second tour in F-86s, he was officially credited with shooting down nine MiG-15s and one La-9. At the time of his return to the United States in October 1952, he was America's leading jet ace.

Early life
Blesse was born on August 22, 1921, in Colón, Panama Canal Zone. His father, Frederick A. Blesse, was a brigadier general in the U.S. Army Medical Corps during World War II. He graduated from American High School at Manila in the Philippines in 1939, and he entered the U.S. Military Academy at West Point in 1942.

Blesse was commissioned a year early due to World War II, graduating from West Point and being awarded his pilot wings on June 5, 1945.

Military career
He earned his pilot wings just as World War II was ending and did not see any combat during the war.

After completing gunnery training and P-47 Thunderbolt training, he was assigned to the 1st Fighter Squadron of the 413th Fighter Group on Okinawa from March to October 1946, and then with the 25th Fighter Squadron of the 51st Fighter Group, also on Okinawa, until March 1948. During this time, Blesse transitioned to the F-80 Shooting Star jet fighter. His next assignment was with the 63d Fighter Squadron of the 56th Fighter Group at Selfridge Air Force Base, where he served from March 1948 to November 1950.

Korean War

Blesse was assigned to the 67th Fighter-Bomber Squadron of the 18th Fighter-Bomber Group  in Korea from November 1950 to February 1951, and then with the 7th Fighter-Bomber Squadron of the 49th Fighter-Bomber Group. He flew F-80 Shooting Stars and P-51 Mustangs, during his first tour of duty in Korea.

He returned to the U.S. in June 1951. Blesse then served with the 94th Fighter-Interceptor Squadron at George Air Force Base until April 1952, when he returned to Korea for a second tour, this time with the 334th Fighter-Interceptor Squadron, returning to the U.S. in October 1952, where he flew F-86 Sabres and was credited in destroying nine MiG-15s and one La-9 in aerial combat plus 1 probable and 3 more damaged. Overall, he flew 223 combat missions in the F-51 Mustang, F-80 Shooting Star, and F-86 Sabre fighters.

Post Korean War
From December 1952 to February 1956, he served as a gunnery instructor and squadron commander at Nellis Air Force Base and he was on the Air Training Command Fighter Gunnery Team in 1954 and 1955. During this time, he wrote the book "No Guts, No Glory", which has been used as a basis for fighter combat operations for many of the world's air forces, such as Royal Air Force, the U.S. Marine Corps, Chinese Nationalist, Korean Air Force, and U.S. Air Force since 1955. As recently as 1973, 3,000 copies were reproduced and sent to tactical units in the field.

During the 1955 Air Force Worldwide Gunnery Championship, he won all six trophies offered for individual performance, a feat never equaled. He transferred to Randolph Air Force Base in February 1956, and served as chief of the Fighter Division of Crew Training until April 1958, when he was assigned to the 32nd Fighter Interceptor Squadron at Soesterberg Air Base, the Netherlands serving as commander of the squadron before returning to the United States in August 1961.

He served as base and squadron commander of the F-100 Super Sabre and F-102 organization. He returned to the United States in August 1961 as a member of the Air Staff with the inspector general, Norton Air Force Base, California, where he served until August 1965. Col Blesse next attended National War College in Washington, D.C. During this assignment he attended night school and earned a master's degree in international relations at The George Washington University. He then attended F-4 Phantom II Combat Crew Training.

Vietnam War
During the Vietnam War, Blesse was assigned as Director of Operations for the 366th Tactical Fighter Wing at Da Nang Air Base in the Republic of Vietnam from April 1967 to April 1968. During this one-year tour of duty, he flew 108 combat missions over North Vietnam and another 46 in Laos and South Vietnam. He was decorated for valor for helping unload the bombs from a burning F-4 Phantom II aircraft during a rocket attack. While on his first tour in 1967–1968, he flew in total 156 combat missions.

Blesse next served as Director of Operations for the 474th Tactical Fighter Wing, U.S. Air Force's first General Dynamics F-111 Aardvark wing at Nellis Air Force Base, from May 1968 until becoming the Wing's commander in June 1969. He was made Commander of the 831st Air Division at George Air Force Base in June 1970. During his second tour in Vietnam, he served as Assistant Director of Operations for 7th Air Force at Tan Son Nhut Air Base in the Republic of Vietnam from January to July 1971.

In May 1968 he again was assigned to Nellis Air Force Base, this time as director of operations of the 474th Tactical Fighter Wing, and in June 1969 became commander. In July 1970 General Blesse became commander of the 831st Air Division at George Air Force Base, California, and then was selected for another tour of duty in the Republic of Vietnam as assistant director of operations for Seventh Air Force, Tan Son Nhut Air Base.
 
Blesse then became Assistant Deputy Chief of Staff for Operations followed by Deputy Chief of Staff for Operations at Headquarters Pacific Air Forces at Hickam Air Force Base, where he served from July 1971 to November 1973. From November 1973 to August 1974, he served as senior Air Force member on the Weapons Systems Evaluation Group in the Office of the Secretary of Defense, followed by service as Deputy Inspector General of the U.S. Air Force, where he served from August 1974 until April 1, 1975.

He retired from the USAF on April 1, 1975, with more than 6,500 flying hours in fighter-type aircraft and more than 650 hours combat time to his credit.

Later life
After his retirement from the Air Force,  he worked with the Grumman Corporation before he completely retired. He lived with his wife, Betty, in Florida. They had four children and three step-children. In December 1998, over 40 years after the Korean War, he was awarded the Distinguished Service Cross for actions during that war.

Blesse died on October 31, 2012 at a golf course in Melbourne, Florida, officially 'flying west'. He was honored with a flyover of F-15 Eagles before being buried with full military honors at Arlington National Cemetery.

Awards and decorations
His military decorations and awards included the Distinguished Service Medal; Silver Star with two oak leaf clusters; Legion of Merit with two oak leaf clusters; Distinguished Flying Cross with silver leaf cluster with "V" device; Bronze Star with "V" device; Air Medal with 20 oak leaf clusters and Purple Heart. He was a command pilot with more than 6,500 flying hours, most of which were in fighter aircraft including the P-40, P-47, P-51 Mustang, P-80, F-86, F-100, F-102, A-7, F-104, F-106, F-4, and F-111. He had more than 650 hours combat flying and is the nation's sixth ranking jet ace.

Distinguished Service Cross citation

Blesse, Frederick C.
Major, U.S. Air Force
 334th Fighter-Interceptor Squadron, 4th Fighter-Interceptor Wing, Far East Air Forces
Date of Action:  September 8, 1952

Citation:

The President of the United States of America, authorized by Act of Congress, July 9, 1918 (amended by act of July 25, 1963), takes pleasure in presenting the Distinguished Service Cross (Air Force) to Major Frederick Corbin Blesse, United States Air Force, for extraordinary heroism in connection with military operations against an armed enemy of the United Nations while serving as Pilot of an F-86 Fighter Airplane of the 334th Fighter-Interceptor Squadron, 4th Fighter-Interceptor Wing, Far East Air Forces, in action against enemy forces in the Republic of Korea on 8 September 1952. Leading a flight of four F-86s protecting fighter-bombers from possible attack by enemy MIGs, Major Blesse positioned his flight for an attack on four sighted MIGs. Singling out one of the MIGs, Major Blesse followed it up into an overcast and broke out between layers of clouds. As the two aircraft emerged from the clouds, Major Blesse was still in position, so he closed and fired, causing the MIG to burst into flames and the pilot to eject himself. Major Blesse then sighted a lone MIG, and positioned himself for another attack. The MIG began violent, evasive maneuvers, but through superior airmanship Major Blesse scored hits, causing the MIG to snap and spin. Major Blesse followed closely until the MIG recovered. He then scored hits with another long burst which caused the pilot to eject himself. Through his courage, keen flying ability and devotion to duty, Major Blesse reflected great credit upon himself, the Far East Air Forces, and the United States Air Force.

References

Further reading
 

1921 births
2012 deaths
United States Air Force personnel of the Korean War
United States Air Force personnel of the Vietnam War
American Vietnam War pilots
American Korean War flying aces
Aviators from the Panama Canal Zone
Recipients of the National Order of Vietnam
Recipients of the Air Medal
Recipients of the Distinguished Flying Cross (United States)
Recipients of the Distinguished Service Cross (United States)
Recipients of the Air Force Distinguished Service Medal
Recipients of the Legion of Merit
Recipients of the Silver Star
Zonians
Recipients of the Gallantry Cross (Vietnam)
Burials at Arlington National Cemetery